Cameroniola kryzhanovskiji is a species of beetle in the family Carabidae, the only species in the genus Cameroniola.

References

Scaritinae